A leadership election for the Czechoslovak People's Party (ČSL) was held during extraordinary congress of the party on 29 September 1990. Josef Lux was elected the new leader.

Candidates
There were 8 candidates.
 Josef Bartončík, the incumbent leader.
 Antonín Baudyš
 Jaroslav Cuhra
 Jiří Karas
 Josef Lux believed that ČSL should be a right wing Christina democratic party.
 Jan Marek, believed that ČSL should remain in opposition.
 Augustin Navrátil
 Richard Sacher

Voting
Josef Bartončík and Antonín Baudyš were considered the strongest candidates. Three candidates advanced to the second round - Bartončík, Baudyš and Lux. Baudyš decided to withdraw from the election and supported Lux. Lux then defeated Bartončík and became the new leader.

References

KDU-ČSL leadership elections
1990s elections in Czechoslovakia
Indirect elections
Czechoslovak People's Party leadership election